The Perfect Accord, also adapted into English as Perfect Harmony, is an oil-on-panel painting by Antoine Watteau, created c. 1719, now held in the Los Angeles County Museum of Art. It was the pendant to the same artist's The Surprise.

It was initially owned by a friend of the artist, Nicolas Hénin, but it and Surprise were sold separately by his heir around 1756.

Exhibition history

Further reading

 
 
 
 
 
 
 
 
 
 
 
 
 
 
 
   . Published in French as

External links
 The Perfect Accord at the LACMA's official web site
 

Paintings by Antoine Watteau
1710s paintings
Musical instruments in art
Collection of the Los Angeles County Museum of Art